Leye is a village in the Alishan, Chiayi County, Taiwan.

The local Taiwanese aborigines call it “La La U Ya” meaning maple forest. To this day, the sign marking the town still has a picture of a maple leaf. However, as the area is high up and has a cool climate, it has suitable conditions for growing tea (a main export) thus, this development has overshadowed the attraction of the maple forest. Leye is also the biggest producer of Phalaenopsis orchids in Taiwan.

References

External links
 Culture and Tourism Bureau of Chiayi County

Populated places in Chiayi County
Villages in Taiwan